Massacoe State Forest is a Connecticut state forest located in the town of Simsbury. The forest comprises two noncontiguous sections: the Great Pond Block, which encompasses  Great Pond, and the Massacoe Block, which lies next to Stratton Brook State Park. Forest recreational activities include hiking, fishing, and bird watching.

References

External links
Massacoe State Forest Connecticut Department of Energy and Environmental Protection
Massacoe State Forest Great Pond Block Map Connecticut Department of Energy and Environmental Protection

Connecticut state forests
Parks in Hartford County, Connecticut
Simsbury, Connecticut
Protected areas established in 1908
1908 establishments in Connecticut